The Soul Artists of Zoo York were one of New York City's first skate crews.

History 
The Soul Artists of Zoo York were a loose-knit collective of skateboarders and graffiti artists.

The Soul Artists of Zoo York skated an abandoned bowl in Van Cortlandt Park called the "Deathbowl," which was the origin of the name for a documentary on the NY skate scene: Deathbowl to Downtown, narrated by Chloe Sevigny, was released in 2008. The name was coined by Marc 'Ali' Edmonds, the president of the original Zoo York graffiti crew.

The clothing company Zoo York, with the blessing of the original Zoo York crew, took the name from the Soul Artists of Zoo York crew.

References 

American artist groups and collectives
American graffiti artists